Karvelas is a surname. Notable people with the surname include:

Aristides Karvelas (born 1994), South African cricketer
Filippos Karvelas (1877 or 1879 – 1952), Greek gymnast
Nikos Karvelas (born 1951), Greek songwriter, producer and singer
Patricia Karvelas, Australian radio presenter, current affairs journalist and political correspondent
Robert Karvelas (1921–1991), American actor

Greek-language surnames